Hans Törnblom (22 December 1888 – 15 July 1973) was a Swedish fencer. He competed in the individual foil and épée events at the 1920 Summer Olympics.

References

External links
 

1888 births
1973 deaths
Swedish male épée fencers
Swedish male foil fencers
Olympic fencers of Sweden
Fencers at the 1920 Summer Olympics
People from Eksjö Municipality
Sportspeople from Jönköping County
20th-century Swedish people